Norway News is an online news site (www.norwaynews.com), written in English. It is dedicated to Norwegian affairs, abroad and domestic since 2003. The news site is run by an Independent Journalist.  It has readers worldwide. A majority of readers reside in the US and Asia, in addition to non- Norwegian speaking individuals inside and outside Norway.

NORWAY NEWS . com and .no is only one online news service from Norway covering USA state department conference call every week including with Ambassador Kurt Volker, U.S. Special Representative for Ukraine Negotiations, Ambassador James Jeffrey, Special Representative for Syria Engagement, Brian H. Hook, Special Representative for Iran and Senior Policy Advisor at the Secretary of State, Admiral James G. Foggo , Commander, U.S. Naval Forces Europe & U.S. Naval Forces Africa, Ambassador Kay Bailey Hutchison, U.S. Permanent Representative to NATO, Under Secretary for Arms Control and International Security Andrea Thompson and many more Press meeting with leaders around the world.

In addition to the news service, Norway News covers information on Norwegian culture, travel, business , sports, Africa and Norway, Asia and Norway, Asylum, China and Norway, Corruption in Norway, Crimes, Defence, Diplomatic relations, Economics, Environment, Farming, Killing, Media Freedom, Middle East and Norway, NATO and Norway, Nobel Peace Prize, Norwegian Aid, Norwegian American, Oil & Gas, Peace Talks, Politics, Racism in Norway, Religion, Russia and Norway, Royal House, Science, Sex scandal, Sports, Spy War, Sri Lanka and Norway, Svalbard, Terrorist, Taiwan and Norway and Video clips and social media info deleting service (www.deleteme.lk) for Asian.

References

External links 
Website
Website

Newspapers published in Oslo
Internet properties established in 2003
European news websites
2003 establishments in Norway